The Julia Reynolds Masterman Laboratory and Demonstration School is a middle and secondary school located in Philadelphia. It is a magnet school, ranked 10th in the nation, located in the Spring Garden neighborhood. Prior to 1958, the school building was used by the Philadelphia High School for Girls and the building was placed on the National Register of Historic Places under that name in 1986.

Rankings and awards
Masterman is ranked first in the School District of Philadelphia and in the state of Pennsylvania. It is considered one of the best college-preparatory public schools in the country. The school has twice been named a National Blue Ribbon School of Excellence. U.S. News & World Report ranked it as the top public school in Pennsylvania since 1996, and 10th in the nation in 2021. The acceptance rate for the middle school is approximately 7%. Acceptance for the high school is approximately 3%, making it one of the most difficult schools to get into in the country.

History
The Julia R. Masterman Laboratory and Demonstration School was established in September 1958 as an academic magnet school for elementary school students in grades 4, 5 and 6. A junior high school program was initiated in 1959, and a senior high school was added in 1976. In 1990 Masterman was re-organized as a middle school (grades 5-8) and a high school (grades 9-12).  Masterman is located in the former Philadelphia High School for Girls building.

Students are admitted from all areas of Philadelphia based on academic performance, and staff members are selected based on professional expertise. The high school is a preparatory school for select students of superior ability.

The school was named for Julia Reynolds Masterman, who was instrumental in establishing the Philadelphia Home and School Council and served as its first president. The Masterman family still participates in school events and contributes awards at commencement.

In 2006 the district considered establishing an annex for 5th and 6th grade students to increase the school's capacity. The proposed site was Stoddard-Fleischer Middle School.

In 2007, Masterman was a filming location for the 2008 M. Night Shyamalan film The Happening starring Mark Wahlberg. The film shows interior shots of a science lab on the fourth floor, the auditorium, and the main corridor of the first floor hallway, along with various other shots of the school.

In 2010, President Barack Obama chose Masterman as the site of his second annual back-to-school speech, which was broadcast nationally. There, he spoke about how the core of America's future is represented by the students of this generation.

Jeannine Payne, who attended Masterman for middle school, was named principal in 2021.

Dress code
The current dress code states that students must wear clothing which is appropriate, acceptable and not offensive in any way.   Jeans are allowed, but cannot be ripped in inappropriate places. Flip-flops, crop-tops, and tank tops are not allowed. References to alcohol, illegal drugs, profanities, or slurs of any sort are not permitted on any personal property.

Beginning in 2001 the School District of Philadelphia required all schools to enact school uniforms or strict dress codes. To comply with the district-wide policy, the administration of Masterman banned shirts with logos and emblems.

Notable alumni
 Kevin Bacon, actor and musician 
 Joel Fagliano, crossword puzzle maker
 Ellen Forney, author, graphic artist 
 Kenneth Frazier, chairman and chief executive officer, Merck & Co.
 Andrea Gardner, former WNBA basketball player
 Stephanie Gatschet, actress
 Leila Josefowicz, concert violinist
 Shana Knizhnik, author and lawyer
 Emtithal Mahmoud, poet
 Angela Nissel, writer 
 Leslie Odom Jr., actor and singer
 Chynna Rogers, rapper and model
 Gregory Shahade, chess player and poker professional
 Jennifer Shahade, chess player
 Eric Slick, musician
 Will Smith, musician and actor — seventh grade
 Raymond Teller, magician and writer

References

External links

Masterman School Website
Masterman Alumni Association
Masterman Home and School Association

Masterman School
Masterman School
Masterman School
Masterman School
School buildings on the National Register of Historic Places in Philadelphia
School District of Philadelphia
Public high schools in Pennsylvania
1958 establishments in Pennsylvania
Spring Garden, Philadelphia